Turumbet (Törömbät) is a rural locality (a selo) and the administrative centre of Turumbetovsky Selsoviet, Aurgazinsky District, Bashkortostan, Russia. The population was 559 as of 2010. There are 7 streets.

Geography 
Turumbet is located 28 km west of Tolbazy (the district's administrative centre) by road. Salikhovo is the nearest rural locality.

References 

Rural localities in Aurgazinsky District